Rubia chinensis is a species of flowering plants belonging to the family Rubiaceae.

It is native to Southern Russian Far East.

References

chinensis